No. 329 Squadron RAF (French language: 329 Forces Aériennes Françaises Libres) was a Royal Air Force fighter squadron founded upon the personnel and traditions of the French 1/2 fighter squadron Storks (Escadron de Chasse 1/2 Cigognes), having markings "5A" 1944-1945.

RAF service
During the period of the Second World War, a large number of the squadrons of RAF were manned by personnel from countries which had been overwhelmed by German military expansionism. This French Air Force unit was an amalgamation of the two flights SPA 3 and SPA 103, which had been two of the more illustrious units of the Great War. The squadron distinguished itself during the Battle of France in 1940 but was disbanded in August 1940, after the fall of France. It was re-formed in July 1941, flying Dewoitine D.520 aircraft. In May 1942, its transfer to North Africa was begun. In November 1942, Operation Torch opened and gave the squadron and other French forces in North Africa, the opportunity to join the Free French Forces. At the end of 1943, it was embarked in HMS King George V, arriving in Ayr, Scotland in January 1944. Once assembled there, on 5 January, the former escadron became 329 Squadron RAF.

After assembling at Ayr, it moved to Perranporth, in Cornwall, UK, to begin equipping with Spitfire Vs.  By March, these had been replaced by Mark IXs.  Becoming operational on 1 March, by which time the mark Vs had been withdrawn. The squadron joined No. 415 Wing RAF Free French units of 2nd Tactical Air Force on 14 April and provided cover for the D Day landings in Normandy in the following June. At this stage, its commanding officer was Lieutenant-colonel (Wing commander) Fleurquin. In August, it moved to Sommervieu, near Bayeux in Normandy, under the command of Capitaine (Flight lieutenant) Ozanne. As a squadron of a tactical wing, it specialized in ground attack of troop movements, road and river supply convoys and V-weapon launch sites. However, the job included air-to-air combat, and after it had moved forward into the Low Countries in September, it met its first jet-propelled opposition in December 1944. In March 1945, No. 329 returned to the UK. It was stationed at Turnhouse. In May 1945, it was moved to the West of England but fifteen of its aircraft participated in the Victory fly-past in Paris on 14 July 1945. It was disbanded in the UK, at Fairwood Common on 17 November 1945.

On the fifteenth, it moved to Friedrichshafen via Le Bourget as EC 1/2 Cigognes (Fighter Squadron 1/2 "Storks"), a unit of the newly reconstituted 2nd Fighter Wing of the French Air Force.

Aircraft
 February 1944 to March 1944 - Supermarine Spitfire Mk. VB.
 February 1944 to March 1944 - Supermarine Spitfire Mk. VC.
 February 1944 to March 1945 - Supermarine Spitfire Mk. IX
 April 1945 to November 1945 - Supermarine Spitfire Mk. IX
 February 1945 to April 1945 - Supermarine Spitfire Mk. XVI

Profiles of the squadron's aircraft, with its markings may be seen on the RAF web site. This shows all the squadron's aircraft with cannon as would suit a ground attack rôle.

Armament 
The Mk VA mounted eight 0.303 machine guns. Mk VB had two 20 mm canon and four 0.303" machine guns. The Mk VC had a universal wing capable of mounting eight 0.303" machine guns or two 20 mm canon and four machine guns. As well as these options, the VC could carry two  bombs. In addition, all three had a centre-line rack for carrying either a  bomb or an external fuel tank. Each was fitted with a Merlin 45 engine: . 

The Mk IX was essentially a Mk V with a more powerful engine (Merlin 61) and the low-level versions had clipped wings. Likewise, the Mk XVI had a more powerful engine still.

References
 Churchill, W.S. The Second World War, Cassel, London. (1951) Vol. IV Chapters XXXIV & XXXV.
 Official French Air Force web site (fr). Squadron entry
 Gunston, Bill. Encyclopedia of the World's Combat Aircraft. Leisure Books, London. (1976)
 Mason, O. Bartholomew Gazetteer of Britain. John Bartholomew & Son, Ltd., Edinburgh. (1977)
 Official Royal Air Force web site Squadron entry
 Unofficial Royal Air Force History web site Squadron entry.

Footnotes

329
Military units and formations disestablished in 1945